Graecoanatolica dinarica is a species of freshwater snail, an aquatic gastropod mollusc in the family Hydrobiidae. The species is endemic to Turkey, and is an endangered species due to pollution and habitat loss.

References

Hydrobiidae
Graecoanatolica
Gastropods described in 2012